Mihailo III was Prince of Duklja, from c. 1180, or before, up to 1186 or 1189. He was descended from the Vojislavljević dynasty, and also cousin to Grand Prince Stefan Nemanja of Serbia. The Principality of Duklja was tributary to the Byzantine Empire until 1180, when Emperor Manuel I died and Empire plunged into turmoil. By 1186, Byzantine possessions in Upper Dalmatia were overrun by Stefan Nemanja, who also imposed his rule over Duklja. The domain of Prince Mihailo was reduced to the coastal regions around Bar, while the rule over Duklja was given to Vukan, eldest son of Stefan Nemanja. Prince Mihailo was patron of the Archbishopric of Bar, and in 1189 his wife, princess Desislava, was accompanied to Dubrovnik by archbishop Gregory of Bar.

See also
 Duklja
 Vojislavljević dynasty
 Stefan Nemanja
 Nemanjić dynasty
 Grand Principality of Serbia

References

Sources

 
 

Rulers of Duklja
Vojislavljević dynasty
12th-century Serbian people